Tekniikka&Talous (Technology&Business in English) is a Finnish language web service and news magazine focusing on innovations published in Helsinki, Finland.

History and profile
Tekniikka&Talous is published by media house Alma Media Oyj. Tekniikka&Talous covers local and global news on business, innovation, science and technology. The print version of the magazine comes out 41 issues per year in tabloid format. The magazine targets decision makers in the fields of innovation, r&d and management as well as marketing and sales.

Tekniikka&Talous was previously published by Talentum. The magazine became part of new business unit Alma Talent, when Alma Media acquired Talentum in September 2015. Other well known brands of Alma Talent are Kauppalehti, Talouselämä, Uusi Suomi and Tivi.

Tekniikka&Talous is distributed to the members of Tekniikan Akateemiset, Academic Engineers and Architects in Finland.

In May 2012 Jyrki Alkio was appointed the editor-in-chief of Tekniikka&Talous.

Circulation
The print version of Tekniikka&Talous had 72,000 weekly readers in 2017. The web service reaches more than 100 000 weekly readers.

See also
List of magazines in Finland

References

External links
 Official websiite

Finnish-language magazines
Magazines published in Helsinki
News magazines published in Europe
Science and technology magazines
Magazines with year of establishment missing